Cornell Apartments is a historic three-story building in Salt Lake City, Utah. It was built in 1910 by W.C.A. Vissing, an immigrant from Denmark who became "one of the most active developers of apartment buildings in Salt Lake City during the pre-World War I period". It was designed in the Colonial Revival and Classical Revival styles. Vissing sold the building to Blanche Castleman in 1912, and it belonged to the Bergerman family from 1923 to 1934. It has been listed on the National Register of Historic Places since October 20, 1989.

See also
Cluff Apartments, also built by Vissing and listed on the National Register

References

National Register of Historic Places in Salt Lake City
Colonial Revival architecture in Utah
Neoclassical architecture in Utah
Residential buildings completed in 1910
1910 establishments in Utah